The Treaty of Sugauli (also spelled Sugowlee, Sagauli and Segqulee), the treaty that established the boundary line of Nepal, was signed on 4 March 1816 between the East India Company and Guru Gajraj Mishra following the Anglo-Nepalese War of 1814–16.

Background 
Following the Unification of Nepal under Prithvi Narayan Shah, Nepal attempted to enlarge its domains, conquering much of Sikkim in the east and, in the west, the basins of Gandaki and Karnali and the Uttarakhand regions of Garhwal and Kumaon. This brought them in conflict with the British, who controlled directly or indirectly the north Indian plains between Delhi and Calcutta. A series of campaigns termed the Anglo-Nepalese War occurred in 1814–1816. In 1815 the British general Ochterlony evicted the Nepalese from Garhwal and Kumaon across the Kali River, ending their 12-year occupation, which is remembered for its brutality and repression.

Octherlony offered peace terms to the Nepalese demanding British suzerainty in the form of a British resident and the delimitation of Nepal's territories corresponding roughly to its present-day boundaries. The Nepalese refusal to accede to the terms led to another campaign the following year, targeting the Kathmandu Valley, after which the Nepalese capitulated.

Terms 
Historian John Whelpton writes:

Geographic Context 
Nepal boasts a salt trade route to Tibet that has been in installment for many decades. This was significant to the economic well-being of the valley of Kathmandu. As the British East Indian Company had profited from Indian trade routes, Nepal’s trade routes were desirable to conquer.

Nepal was a relatively newly established nation that did not have well-established boundaries with lax enforcement around the supposed borders. In conjunction with its frustration with this, and its desire for the trade routes, the British East Indian Company declared war against Nepal known as the Anglo-Nepalese War from 1814 to 1816. Nepal’s advantage lied in their highly esteemed army of men known as the “Gurkhas” whom were also of interest to the Company. As a smaller and less developed country, Nepal eventually relented in the war and agreed upon a ceasefire under the terms and conditions of the Sugauli Treaty.

Reasons the Treaty was Signed 
Three of the main goals of the Company were to employ Nepal’s impressive army, establish a presence of supervision in the Nepali court, and utilise its trading routes to Tibet. Naturally, the decision to sign the treaty was not treated with full acceptance by the Nepali court and roused a large point of controversy. Bhimsen Thapa, Nepal’s prime minister at the time “realised that the best way to ensure Nepal’s continued freedom from interference was to grant the governor general’s basic desire, a secure and trouble-free border”. In attempts to mitigate the devastation to Nepal’s sovereignty and security, the treaty was signed.

From the British perspective, the bureaucratic efforts of colonising Nepal was impractical in comparison to placing its certain aspects under the British employment.

Effects of the Treaty 
The treaty stipulated that Nepal’s government structure be without external interference and that aside from the singular British residence in the Nepali court, their national affairs would not be compromised. In addition to the benefit of Nepal’s continued sovereign independence, an alliance was established between the two governments.

Aftermath 
The treaty saw three decades of peace following its implementation, however, other issues began to arise starting in 1840.  “An army mutiny over proposed pay reductions almost turned into an attack on the British residency because the soldiers were led to believe that the cuts had been forced on the Nepalese government by the British” in June 1840" This followed as a result of suspicions that arose in the Nepali court that its independence in internal government affairs was being infringed upon. Another incidence of alarm occured in 1842 during a debt lawsuit over an Indian Merchant, Kasinath Mull, the British resident in the Nepalese court, Brian Hodgson appeared hostile and assertive, implicating attempted control over the independence of decision in the court. Through these issues, the success of the treaty’s attempt to buffer tensions may still be debated.

Boundary Treaty of 1860 
In 1857, Indian Mutiny began a rebellion which was declared the First War of Independence against British rule and was fought by the Indian army employed under the British. During this time, a division of the Gurkha soldiers was sent to the war in support of the British and aided in its success, establishing a friendlier form of diplomacy that ultimately called for a revision in the Sugauli Treaty that panned more positively in favor of Nepal’s independence and territorial integrity. This would be called the Boundary Treaty of 1860.

Ongoing disputes 
Among the border dispute of the Indo-Nepal boundary, the most significant are in the Susta and Kalapani regions. The two regions cover some 40 km of the Indo-Nepal border.

See also
 Nepal–Britain Treaty of 1860
 1950 Indo-Nepal Treaty of Peace and Friendship
 Gurkha War
 Kingdom of Nepal
 Naya Muluk - land in western Terai restored to Nepal in 1860
 Prithvi Narayan Shah
 Sikkim
 Unification of Nepal

References

Bibliography

External links

 Treaty Text and Related Documents
 Indian-Nepalese Border

Treaties involving territorial changes
Treaties of Nepal
History of Uttarakhand
Peace treaties of the United Kingdom
1816 treaties
Treaties of the British East India Company
Anglo-Nepalese War
1816 in Nepal